The 2020 Porsche PAYCE Carrera Cup Australia was the sixteenth running of the Porsche Carrera Cup Australia motor racing series. This season had been greatly affected by the COVID-19 pandemic and had the scheduled rounds in the calendar cancelled after the first race of round two during the 2020 Australian Formula 1 Grand Prix weekend in Albert Park Melbourne. The year's season had a weekend at Sandown Raceway from the 11th-13th December. No champion was crowned this year's season due to the COVID-19 pandemic.

Teams and drivers

Calendar 
A revised calendar for the remaining season was announced on 19 June 2020.

Series standings 
Series standings are as follows:

Notes

References

External links
 

Australian Carrera Cup Championship seasons
Porsche Carrera Cup Australia